AMD FireMV, formerly ATI FireMV, is brand name for graphics cards marketed as a Multi-Display 2D video card, with 3D capabilities same as the low-end Radeon graphics products. It competes directly with Matrox professional video cards. FireMV cards aims at the corporate environment who require several displays attached to a single computer. FireMV cards has options of dual GPU, a total of four display output via a VHDCI connector, or single GPU, a total of two display output via a DMS-59 connector.

FireMV cards are available for PCI and PCI Express interfaces.

Although these are marketed by ATI as mainly 2D cards, the FireMV 2250 cards support OpenGL 2.0 since it is based on the RV516 GPU found in the Radeon X1000 Series released 2005.

The FireMV 2260 is the first video card to carry dual DisplayPort output in the workstation 2D graphics market, sporting DirectX 10.1 support.

Chipset table

See also 
 AMD Eyefinity – introduced with Radeon HD 5000 Series in September 2009
 List of AMD graphics processing units

References

External links
 FireMV series page at ATI
 https://www.amd.com/Documents/ATI_FireMV_2260_Data_Sheet.pdf

ATI Technologies products
Graphics cards
Multi-monitor